Leszek Hensler (4 February 1956 – 3 June 2015) was a Polish field hockey player. He competed in the men's tournament at the 1980 Summer Olympics.

References

External links
 

1956 births
2015 deaths
Polish male field hockey players
Olympic field hockey players of Poland
Field hockey players at the 1980 Summer Olympics
People from Gniezno